Rajawali Televisi (RTV, stylized as rtv) is a commercial television network in Indonesia, owned by Rajawali Corpora. RTV is currently segmented as "family television", licensed via the Ministry of Communication and Information Technology, and its frequency is coordinated through the Department of Transportation. RTV officially aired for the first time on 1 November 2009, in Jakarta as the B-Channel. With 24 hours of airtime, RTV's current programs focus on entertainment, soft news, and a variety of animation programs, ranging from anime, tokusatsu and children's animation. The B-Channel changed its name to RTV with the launch of Langit Rajawali on 3 May 2014.

In 2016, Mayapada acquired a 20% stake in RTV ownership from Rajawali Corpora. Mayapada later acquired another television network INTV (formerly Banten TV), which in 2019 was relaunched as MYTV.

History 
B-Channel was co-founded by Sofia Koswara and Rajawali Corpora in 2008, at the time was relayed through a local television station in Cikarang, TVN (now part of RTV regional stations); which later launched on 1 November 2009. In 2012, Rajawali Corpora bought Sofia Koswara's stake in B-Channel. On 3 May 2014, B-Channel changed its name to RTV during the Langit Rajawali show. In August 2016, Mayapada Group acquired 20% stocks of RTV.

On 30 March 2017 on their press conference, RTV announced that they will focus more on children's programmes,. In February 2018, RTV opened its mini studio at KidZania Jakarta.

Broadcast coverage 

RTV broadcasts from Greater Jakarta and surrounding areas, reaching over 23 UHF frequencies. Since August 2018, RTV is available throughout Indonesia from satellite Telkom-4 (previously from satellite Apstar 6 and Palapa D). Additionally, RTV broadcasts can be watched from subscription television, including Transvision, IndiHome, and Skynindo. This is in addition to RTV's transmitter network.

In terms of coverage, RTV is among the top TV networks in Indonesia. It currently has 44 transmission stations in 206 cities in the country. The TV is also available on other platforms, such as pay TV, online streaming, and other digital media.

Programming 
Since 2019, RTV programs largely consist of animation. Despite this, RTV is not a children's interest channel.

Animation programming 
The aforementioned animation programming airs from 12:00 to 4:00 pm on weekdays, consisting of children's animated series from morning to afternoon, and anime/tokusatsu series in the evening. RTV also has a time slot known as Zona Ceria; now had been split into Sinema Ceria, Sinema Keluarga, Mega Hero, Super Anime and Super Girly (see #Time slots).

News programming 
RTV has a news programming entitled Lensa Indonesia (formerly Lensa Sore); which airs in the morning, noon, afternoon, and midnight. RTV airs criminal news entitled CSI: Catatan Seputar Investigasi, Turn Back Crime, and 10-2: Lihat, Lapor, Lacak. During 2014 and 2015 elections, RTV also airs Indonesia Menentukan.

On 27 September 2020, Lensa Indonesia Sore ended due to the entry of children's programmes; and was replaced by the expanded slot of short news Lensa Indonesia Update.

Others/miscellaneous 
From 2017 to 2018, anniversary specials aired on Pesta Sahabat, formerly stand-alone and not-made-for-kids from 2015 to 2016. To celebrates its fifth anniversary, RTV airs Hey Tayo on 3 May 2019; which is based on the children's animated series Tayo the Little Bus. At this time, RTV's old mascot Mr. Ravi, was replaced by Rio, which is depicted as a purple-colored superhero with an eagle head-like helmet; although currently its mascots are usually rarely used. RTV does not air sixth-anniversary specials in 2020.

RTV now rarely airs cigarette advertisements except for some shows sponsored by cigarette brands (e.g. DCODE sponsored by Dunhill).

Time slots (only used on promos and official show names) 
Drama Korea: Korean dramas slot, now replaced with Mega Korea
Female Corner: Shows intended for women audiences
Mega Aksi: Chinese and Asian colossal dramas slot
Mega Hero: Tokusatsu series in evening, split from Sinema Keluarga 
Mega Klasik Indonesia: Indonesian colossal dramas slot.
Mega Indonesia: Indonesian Classic TV dramas slot
Mega Korea: Korean dramas slot which replaces Drama Korea
Satwa Mania: Documentaries about animals
Sinema Ceria: Animated series slot, which replaced Zona Ceria as time slot; usually airs in morning
Sinema Keluarga: Another animated series slot, usually afternoon and evening
Super Anime: Anime series slot
Super Girly: Animated series intended for girls, now no longer branded
Zona Ceria: Early time slot for children's animated series. Now, this name is used for sponsored school events and Giveaway activity was held by RTV

Presenters

Current 
 Kenia Gusnaeni (former MNCTV and BeritaSatu anchor)
 Oscar Haris
 Michael Tjandra (former RCTI anchor)
 Achmad Topan (former Kompas TV and Bloomberg TV Indonesia anchor)
 Ezra Hadianto
 Arina Marisa Manurung
 Tasya Syarief (former RCTI anchor)
 Retno Ayu (former RCTI anchor)
 Stephani Defirstta
 Felicia Wu
 Zacky Hussein (former Global TV, iNews, NET., and MYTV anchor)

 Rian Antono
 Pramadhika Samudera (former BeritaSatu anchor)

Former
 Daniar Achri (now at CNN Indonesia, Trans7and Trans TV)
 Karra Raska Syam (now at tvOne)
 Fristian Griec (now at TVRI)
 Prabu Revolusi (now at MNC News and BuddyKu also as a host Konspirasi Prabu)
 Sheika Rauf
 Widi Dwinanda (now at RCTI as a host Silet)
 Reinhard Sirait (now at iNews and MNC News)
 Silvano Hajid (now at BBC Indonesia)
 Mehulika Sitepu
 Cheryl Tanzil
 Ichsan Firmansyah
 Desi Dwi Jayanti
 Senandung Nacita
 Intan Bedisa
 Richard Lioe
 Nikky Sirait
 Riana Rifani
 Inne Sudjono (now at BMKG)
 Stefani Ginting (now at BTV)

Slogans 
As the B-Channel
Inside Big City (20 October 2008 – 31 October 2009, during the trial broadcast)
B Inspired! (1 November 2009 – 31 December 2010)
Inspirasi Keluarga Anda (Your Family Inspiration) (1 January 2011 – 30 September 2012)
Inspirasi Anda (Your Inspiration) (1 October 2012 – 3 May 2014)

As RTV
Untuk Indonesia (For Indonesia) (3 May 2014 – 1 June 2018)
Makin Cakep (More Cute) (1 June 2018 – present)

Anniversary specials 
Setahun di Langit (2015)
Harmoni Cinta (2016)
Cak3p (2017)
RTV 4 Makin Cakep (2018)
Sahabat Tayo (2019)
RTV 5 Makin Cakep: Hey Tayo (2019)
RTV 6 Cakepan Dirumah (2020)
RTV 7Agoan Kemenangan Negeri Rajawali (2021)

See also 
 List of television stations in Indonesia
 List of programs aired on RTV (in Indonesian language)

References

External links 
  

Children's television networks
Television networks in Indonesia
Television channels and stations established in 2009
2009 establishments in Indonesia
Mass media in Jakarta